i-City is a  ICT-based urban development beside the Federal Highway in Section 7, Shah Alam, Selangor, Malaysia. Planned by architect Jon A. Jerde, i-City was designed as a fully integrated intelligent city, comprising corporate, leisure and residential components such as a  regional shopping mall, office towers, Cybercentre office suites, hotels, apartments, data centers, and an innovation center.

i-City is an MSC Malaysia Cybercentre where knowledge-based companies with MSC Malaysia status can exploit the various incentives offered under the MSC Malaysia Bills of Guarantee. It has also been endorsed as a tourism destination by the Ministry of Tourism and declared an International Park by the Selangor State Government. Such venues allow for entertainment and other cosmopolitan lifestyle outlets to operate on a 24-7 basis.

i-City gross development value has increased to MYR 10 billion project from MYR 1.5 billion in 2005.

Overview 
i-City plans to be a business location for six industry clusters, namely shared services and outsourcing, biotechnology, software development, as a media hub, an Islamic financial hub, and a data centre.

Landmark 

Jewel i-City, is a  proposed supertall skyscraper in Shah Alam, Selangor, Malaysia. It is the centerpiece and the landmark of the project. It stands  in height, changing the skyline of Shah Alam forever. But it doesn't stand on the project as of today. Because it is still proposed. It will surpass the previous record holder, DoubleTree by Hilton i-City, The tallest building in Shah Alam as of today

Buildings 
Within i-City, CityPark is the designated building to house MSC Malaysia-status companies. The entire i-City development will feature eight corporate office towers, two luxury hotels, two blocks of 24-story residences, three and five story shop-offices, and retail suites.

Hotels
As of December 2019, Best Western International is currently operating the three-star Best Western i-City hotel while in 2020, Hilton Worldwide Group will operate the four-star DoubleTree by Hilton i-City Hotel.

Shopping Mall
Central i-City shopping centre is a joint venture project between Thai outfit Central Pattana Public Company Limited (CPN) and i-City Properties Sdn Bhd. The shopping centre costs RM 850 million. Spanning  over 350 retail stores across six levels, the shopping centre is the largest in Shah Alam. The shopping mall had its soft opening on 23 March 2019 and was officially launched by Sultan of Selangor Sultan Sharafuddin Idris Shah on 15 June 2019.

Data Centre 
i-City has launched their Data Centre Park, which aims to be one of the largest data centre space providers in a single location in Malaysia. The Data Centre Park is designed for data centre service providers and large companies who plan to build their own data centre buildings.

City of Digital Lights

Snowalk 
SnoWalk is a  arctic environment attraction with 100 tons of ice sculptures that were shaped by a team of 30 ice sculptors from Harbin, China.

Waterworld 
WaterWorld at i-City features water rides and games ranging from tame to wild in their propensity to provide thrills for family. The main attraction consists of vortex water ride from a steep  launch tower and water slides.

Red Carpet 2 
Red Carpet 2 is Malaysia's first home-grown interactive wax museum.

Events 
i-City has hosted various large-scale events and programmes, such as Malaysia's Independence Day Celebration on 31 August and the Mid-Autumn Festival. During the 2010 World Cup, i-City also showed the matches live from Johannesburg on its  video wall, the largest video screen in Southeast Asia. It has also hosted MTV World Stage Live in Malaysia, in July 2011.

Miscellaneous 
"True Discovery" is a reptile exhibition located behind Old Town White Coffee Shop. It houses a reptile collection as well as exotic animals like snakes and tarantulas. Among its attractions is a two headed terrapin.

Transit
The station is a 10-minute drive from i-City.

Central i-City shopping mall provides shuttle buses connecting the mall to Padang Jawa KTM station at half-hourly intervals.

i-City will be connected by the Bandar Utama-Klang LRT Line via the  I-City LRT Station once the LRT line starts operation in 2024.

Accolades
In 2017, i-City was named one of the world's top 25 brightest and most colourful places by CNN Travel.

References

External links

 Tourism Malaysia - i-City
 i-City Wiki
 I-City Shah Alam, Attractions in Malaysia

2009 establishments in Malaysia
MSC Malaysia
High-technology business districts in Malaysia
Shah Alam